Acroporium is a genus of mosses belonging to the family Sematophyllaceae.

The species of this genus are found predominantly in Southern Hemisphere.

Species:
 Acroporium aciphyllum Dixon, 1924 
 Acroporium adspersum Brotherus, 1925

References

Hypnales
Moss genera